The R290 road is a regional road in Ireland linking the R287 and the N59 in County Sligo.

From the R287, the road goes west via Ballintogher before reaching Ballygawley and briefly joining the R284. From Ballygawley, the road continues west to the N4 and Collooney. From Collooney the road follows the route of the former N4 before reaching the N59 at Ballysadare.

See also
Roads in Ireland

References

Regional roads in the Republic of Ireland
Roads in County Sligo